Provident fund is another name for pension fund. Its purpose is to provide employees with lump sum payments at the time of exit from their place of employment. This differs from pension funds, which have elements of both lump sum as well as monthly pension payments. As far as differences between gratuity and provident funds are concerned, although both types involve lump sum payments at the end of employment, the former operates as a defined benefit plan, while the latter is a defined contribution plan.

Specific provident funds include:

 Employees' Provident Fund Organisation, India's statutory retirement plan
 Mandatory Provident Fund, Hong Kong's retirement plan
 Central Provident Fund, Singapore's retirement plan
 Employees Provident Fund (Malaysia), Malaysia's retirement plan
 Employees Provident Fund (Nepal), Nepal's retirement Plan
 Central Provident Fund (South Africa), a retirement trust 
 Instituto del Fondo Nacional de la Vivienda para los Trabajadores, Mexico's public pension fund and largest mortgage lender 
 National Social Security Fund (Kenya)
 , China mainland's retirement plan

Pension funds
Broad-concept articles